Karen Ansel is a visual effects specialist in the United States.

Previously an Australian musician, she was an influential member of the Australian band The Reels. In 2001, the title track "Quasimodo's Dream" from their album Quasimodo's Dream was voted one of the Top 10 Australian Songs of all time by APRA.

Ansel worked in visual effects at Industrial Light & Magic in the United States. She supervised the Academy Award-winning effects in Vincent Ward’s film What Dreams May Come, as well as Nutty Professor II: The Klumps, Flubber, and artist Matthew Barney's Cremaster Cycle. Her film credits range from The Mask (1993) to Angels & Demons (2009), in addition to other major Hollywood film titles.

In 2010, Ansel became a member of the Academy of Motion Picture Arts and Sciences (Visual Effects Branch).

Other film credits include still photography for Mystify: Michael Hutchence, directed by Richard Lowenstein (2019).

Early career
In 1984 Ansel attended Middlesex Polytechnic with Dr. John Vince, studying Fortran and his custom PICASO graphics software.

In 1986 she started working in Australia 3D with Gary Tregaskis on his in-house 3D software, which transitioned into his world release of Flame. She continued working through various Australian production companies, gaining experience on Alias/Wavefront, SoftImage, Prisms (Houdini) and code-based compositing. Her early broadcast CG work includes 3D animations and design for national TV sports and station IDs, Barcelona Olympics and various music videos.

She worked on ‘lightpen’ animations for Pete Townshend's film White City and Face the Face, directed by Richard Lowenstein.

Her VFX supervision for Max Q, MondayNightBySatellite, in 1989, involved early renderings of the Mandelbrot set.

VFX for film
Ansel attended Siggraph conferences since 1989, and in 1991 began work with digital visual effects for film in the US at VIFX, using particle software (Prisms/Houdini). In 1993 she joined Industrial Light & Magic for The Mask (most recognizably the ‘wolf’ sequence as technical director) and other projects including the initial scene reconstruction for digital of Star Wars: A New Hope, a ‘proof of concept’ sequence with a small team which included Joe Letteri and Steve Williams, utilizing in-house software developed for the sequence.

She went to Weta Digital for The Frighteners in New Zealand, one of the earliest incarnations of the company. Returning to the US, she formed an independent 3D production company in Los Angeles, whose contract work included Flubber, Nutty Professor II, and artist Matthew Barney's Cremaster cycle. As CG supervisor on What Dreams May Come, she supervised the ‘painted world’ sequence. The film won the 1999 Academy Award for Visual Effects, and the ‘painted world’ optical flow-based image manipulation, developed on the film, won the Academy Technical Achievement award in 2007.

Continuing to maintain hands-on skills in developing technologies in large and small visual effects production companies in the US, Canada, New Zealand and Australia afforded Ansel a broad perspective on various approach in the industry of technological developments. In 2004 she travelled to Beijing as VFX consultant for Tsui Hark's Seven Swords. As digital artist she created the 10K rendering for The Hulk poster and worked on productions including Men in Black II, Pirates of the Caribbean: At Worlds End, The Hobbit: 'An Unexpected Journey, The Desolation of Smaug and Tintin.

As CG supervisor on Angels & Demons she developed the pipeline, look and technical approach for rendering complex architecture.

She has presented at conferences including Ausgraph, Siggraph and the Latin American Film Festival.

Ansel is a member of the Academy of Motion Picture Arts and Sciences (Visual Effects Branch).

She is currently researching programs for ‘girls in tech’ and pathways for mentorship within professional environments.

She combines artistic and technological disciplines with a director's vision to support innovative storytelling.

Solo discography
1983: "No Commotion" b/w "Casa", produced by Neil Finn)

References

External links
Karen Ansel recordings at Discogs

Australian rock keyboardists
Australian new wave musicians
Women new wave singers
Industrial Light & Magic people
Living people
Year of birth missing (living people)
The Reels members
Women keyboardists
Australian expatriates in the United States